was the mayor of Osaka in Japan. He was elected in 2007 with centre-left support from the Democratic Party of Japan (DPJ), People's New Party and the Social Democratic Party, defeating the centre-right supported incumbent Jun'ichi Seki by 50,000 votes.

Hiramatsu unsuccessfully ran for re-election in Osaka's mayoral election on 27 November 2011, when his challenger was the former Osaka Governor Tōru Hashimoto. Despite support from both major Japanese national parties (the DPJ and the Liberal Democratic Party), and the Japanese Communist Party retracting their candidate to support his re-election bid, Hiramatsu lost to Hashimoto by a margin of well over 200,000 votes.

References

External links

 

1948 births
Living people
Doshisha University alumni
Japanese announcers
Mayors of Osaka
People from Amagasaki